Marcus Vincent Williams (born 8 April 1986) is an English professional footballer who plays as a left back.

Williams started his career at Scunthorpe United before moving to Reading and then to Sheffield United. Williams has signed for Scunthorpe on four occasions, twice on a permanent contract and twice on loan, as well as spending a short period on loan with Peterborough United.

Career

Scunthorpe United
Williams was born in Doncaster, South Yorkshire. He began his career as a trainee with Scunthorpe United, signing a professional contract on 3 August 2005.

Reading
He signed for Championship club Reading on 11 May 2010 on a free transfer, signing a three-year contract after he turned down a new contract at Scunthorpe. He joined League One club Peterborough on 12 November 2010 on a one-month loan. On 24 March 2011, Williams rejoined Scunthorpe United on loan until the end of the 2010–11 season.

Sheffield United
He joined League One club Sheffield United on 13 September 2011 on a 28-day emergency loan as cover for the injured Lecsinel Jean-François. He made his debut the same day in a 3–0 home loss to Huddersfield Town. The loan was extended for further two months to keep him at United until 13 December 2011.

Williams joined United permanently on 1 January 2012, signing a two-and-a-half-year contract on a free transfer. Following his transfer, however, Williams rarely featured for the Blades and spent much of the following eighteen months sat on the side lines. With the arrival of new manager David Weir, Williams was restored to the starting line up for the opening matches of the 2013–14 season.

Return to Scunthorpe United
On 28 November 2013, Williams re-joined Scunthorpe United on loan until 1 January 2014. He signed permanently for Scunthorpe on 10 January 2014 on a one-and-a-half-year contract, having had his contract with Sheffield United cancelled.

Kerala Blasters
Williams signed for Indian Super League club Kerala Blasters on 29 August 2015.

Guiseley
Williams signed for National League club Guiseley on 4 August 2016. On 13 February 2018, Williams joined National League North club York City on loan until the end of the 2017–18 season. He made his debut four days later as a sixth-minute substitute for the injured Alex Pattison in a 4–1 defeat away to Curzon Ashton. He did not play again before being recalled by Guiseley on 20 March 2018. He was released at the end of 2017–18.

Style of play
Williams plays at left back. Upon signing for Reading in May 2010, he was described as a "modern attacking full back".

Career statistics

Honours
Scunthorpe United
Football League One: 2006–07
Football League Two runner-up: 2013–14
Football League Trophy runner-up: 2008–09

References

External links

1986 births
Living people
Footballers from Doncaster
English footballers
Association football defenders
Scunthorpe United F.C. players
Reading F.C. players
Peterborough United F.C. players
Sheffield United F.C. players
Kerala Blasters FC players
Guiseley A.F.C. players
York City F.C. players
English Football League players
Indian Super League players
National League (English football) players
English expatriate footballers
Expatriate footballers in India
English expatriate sportspeople in India